is a Japanese rower. She competed in the women's lightweight double sculls event at the 2008 Summer Olympics.

References

External links
 

1983 births
Living people
Japanese female rowers
Olympic rowers of Japan
Rowers at the 2008 Summer Olympics
Sportspeople from Saitama Prefecture
21st-century Japanese women